Remapping may refer to:
 Tuning an engine for better performance or fuel efficiency by remapping the Engine control unit
 Redefining keys on a keyboard, for example Gateway_AnyKey#Programming
 Sector remapping, the automatic replacement of bad sectors by good ones in a hard disk drive